Gmelina is a genus of crustaceans of the family Gammaridae, containing two species:
 Gmelina aestuarica Carausu, 1943
 Gmelina costata G. O. Sars, 1894

References

Gammaridea
Malacostraca genera